Sergey Petrovich Komarov was a Soviet and Russian stage and film actor, film director, screenwriter and pedagogue. Honored Artist of the RSFSR.

Selected filmography 
 1926 — By the Law
 1928 — The House on Trubnaya
 1933 — Outskirts
 1936 — Cosmic Voyage
 1948 — The Young Guard
 1955 — The Grasshopper

References

External links 
 Сергей Комаров on kino-teatr.ru

1891 births
1957 deaths
20th-century Russian male actors
20th-century Russian screenwriters
People from Vyazniki
Honored Artists of the RSFSR
Recipients of the Order of the Red Banner of Labour
Silent film directors
Russian film directors
Russian male film actors
Russian male silent film actors
Russian military personnel of World War I
Russian screenwriters
Soviet film directors
Soviet male film actors

Soviet male silent film actors
Soviet screenwriters
Burials at Donskoye Cemetery